Cynthia Cypert is an American actress and stunt performer best known for such films and television series as T. J. Hooker, Patriot Games, The Sting II, The Master and Matt Houston.

References

External links

Living people
American film actresses
American television actresses
American stunt performers
Year of birth missing (living people)
Place of birth missing (living people)
21st-century American women